The football tournament at the 1959 Southeast Asian Peninsular Games was held from 13 December to 17 December 1959 in Bangkok, Thailand.

Results

Group stage

* It is not certain whether goal difference or goal average was used to determine the finalists. Both methods gave the same results.

Final

Winner

Medal winners

Note: There was no bronze medal match.  It is unknown if Malaya were awarded the bronze medal as they finished third in the group. A photo of the award ceremony shown three players but only Vietnamese and Thai players are identified.

External links
South East Asian Peninsula Games 1959 at RSSSF

References

Southeast
Football at the Southeast Asian Games
1959
1959 in Thai sport
Football